Walking is the main form of animal locomotion on land, distinguished from running and crawling.

Walking may also refer to:

Activities

Sports 
Walk (baseball), an award of first base to a batter following four balls being thrown by the pitcher
Walking (basketball), taking too many steps with the basketball without dribbling it
Walking (cricket), a batter leaving the pitch without waiting for the umpire to declare him out
Racewalking, a track and field (athletics) event

Other activities
Fulling, a step in making woolen cloth
Hiking, walking as a form of exercise or recreation, especially in a nature setting
Walkout, a form of protest, particularly in a labor context

Arts and media

Music
Walkin', a 1954 album by Miles Davis
The Walking, a 1988 album by Jane Siberry
"Walkin", a song by Denzel Curry
"Walking", a song by The Kelly Family
"Walking", a song by Soul Asylum from their 1984 album Say What You Will, Clarence...Karl Sold the Truck
"Walking", a song by Tindersticks from their 1997 album Curtains
Walking bass

Other uses in arts and media 
Walking (1961 film), a Soviet drama film
Walking (1968 film), a film by Ryan Larkin
Walking (Thoreau), an 1861 essay by Henry David Thoreau

See also
Shank's mare (disambiguation) (and numerous variants, e.g., shanks mare, shanks' mare, shanks' nag, shanks-nag, shanks' pony)
Walk (disambiguation)
The Walk (disambiguation)